Loot is a 2011 Hindi-language crime comedy film directed by Rajnish Raj Thakur and Cinematography by T. Surendra Reddy, starring Govinda, Suniel Shetty, Mahaakshay Chakraborty, Jaaved Jaaferi, Shweta Bhardwaj and Ravi Kissen . It released on 4 November 2011, to mixed reviews from critics and was a commercial failure. The film is a loose remake of the 2003 film, Crime Spree.

Plot
Loot revolves around the misadventures of four criminals comprising Builder (Suniel Shetty), Pandit (Govinda), Akbar (Jaaved Jaaferi) and Wilson (Mahaakshay Chakraborty) who work for one Batliwala (Dalip Tahil). The four rogues are sent on a mission to Pattaya to rob a house filled with priceless valuables. However, the quartet soon discover that the house they have been sent to rob belongs to a dreaded don named Lalla Bhatti (Mahesh Manjrekar), an unpleasant sod who doesn't think twice about breaking his own brother's arm (Shehzad Khan) for an unpaid debt. If robbing a don's residence was not enough, the quarter also manage to get in the way of a 'poetic' spouting Intelligence agent VP Singh (Ravi Kissen) keeping tabs on the don, an underworld patriarch Khan (Prem Chopra) and an East Asian thug named Asif trying to trace his stolen car. Pretty soon, all the characters of the film are pulled in a cat and mouse game with each other, with some audio tapes containing some damning conversations being the prize of the game. In the climax, the quartet, with some help by a local hustler Varinder (Mika Singh) and his moll Sharmili (Kim Sharma) manage to set off the bad guys against each other. But soon enough, it is revealed that Batliwala was behind the whole thing, and wanted to set the quartet up to get revenge on his brother who is now in jail because of them. The quartet manage to save themselves and hire Khan to murder Batliwala.

Cast
 Govinda as Pandit
 Suniel Shetty as Builder
 Jaaved Jaaferi as Akbar Qureshi
 Mahaakshay Chakraborty as Wilson
 Ravi Kissen as V.P. Singh
 Shweta Bhardwaj as Tanya Sharma
 Mahesh Manjrekar as Lala Taufeeq Omar Bhatti
 Mika Singh as Varinder Yuvraaj Singh (VYS)
 Kim Sharma as Sharmili Siqueira (SMS)
 Dalip Tahil as Batliwala
 Prem Chopra as Khan
 Shehzad Khan as Lala's brother
 Razzak Khan as Razak
 Rakhi Sawant in an item number "Jawani Bank Loot Le"

Production
The filming began in Summer 2008. It completed shooting in early 2010, and was expected to release in June 2010. The release date was then delayed, and postponed to Dussehra 2010. Though, due to financial problems, director Rajnish Thakur pushed back the release date. In September 2010, he announced that the film would be releasing in Diwali 2010. He revealed the official first look poster on 28 September 2011. The theatrical trailer was revealed on 10 October 2011, alongside Rascals in cinemas.

Soundtrack

Reception
Joginder Tuteja of Bollywood Hungama give it 2 stars out of five and commented "As mentioned earlier, the music of Loot came with hardly any expectations due to which whatever little is offered does turn out to be a bonus element".

References

External links
 

2010s Hindi-language films
2011 films
2010s heist films
2010s crime comedy films
Indian crime comedy films
Indian heist films
Viacom18 Studios films
Indian remakes of British films
2011 comedy films